Staithes and Runswick Lifeboat Station is a Royal National Lifeboat Institution (RNLI) lifeboat station based in the village of Staithes, North Yorkshire, England. The station was first opened in 1875 but has been closed for two periods between then and the 21st century due to a decline in the fishing industry and the ability to supply people to crew the lifeboat. It is now host to an Inshore Lifeboat (ILB).

History

A lifeboat at Runswick, just to the south of Staithes, was established in 1866, with another at Staithes nine years later. The RNLI had wished to station a lifeboat in Staithes by 1870, but had given up on the idea as there was a lack of suitable locations to site the lifeboathouse. In 1874, a wealthy donation, and a codicil in a will of a benefactor that stipulated that a lifeboat should be stationed there, enabled the RNLI to press ahead with its plans. The crew used an old alum warehouse as a temporary lifeboathouse  until the official RNLI one could be built.

The lifeboathouse was built at Staithes in 1875 and adapted in 1910, and both Staithes and  lifeboat stations operated side by side, but a lack of members and a decline in the fishing fleet at Staithes, precipitated the closure of Staithes in 1922. The station was re-opened in 1928 after the Ministry of Agriculture and Fisheries installed a harbour and breakwaters. This created a resurgence in fishing from Staithes and the RNLI provided a lifeboat. The resurgence was short lived however, the station closed again in 1938. In January 1978, the site was used as a testbed for the new  lifeboats. After an acceptance trial, it was decided to re-open Staithes.

The station officially re-opened on 17 June 1978, with Runswick closing on 30 June 1978. The station had been operational since April 1978, when the first new ILB had been sent for trials. The Staithes lifeboat occupied the same station that had been built in 1875; this building is now grade II listed. The lifeboathouse is on a stretch of land known as the "Cowbar" and the slipway gentle curves towards the bay allowing the lifeboat to be launched by a tractor.

The people of Runswick Bay later instituted their own independent lifeboat which is known as the Runswick Bay Rescue Boat (RBRB). By 1984, the RBRB was fully accredited with the coastguard and is part of the overall response to emergencies in the north east region, being seen as a complement to the RNLI services not as competing or hindering them.

The station has a yearly Lifeboat Weekend. The event sees a nightgown parade, a fireworks display and demonstrations at sea and usually has over 2,000 people attending. The event is held across both villages of Staithes and Runswick.

Notable callouts
 27 November 1888 - a great storm raged on the sea, and the Staithes lifeboat went out to aid the return of forty-five fishing cobles. The final launch to bring the last coble back to port was feared to be a disaster when the storm worsened overnight; neither ship was sighted, and also, two bodies were washed ashore. Whilst those on the coble were not saved, the crew and boat battled through the storm with significant damage to the lifeboat. The lifeboat crew were picked up by a passing steamer and dropped off at Middlesbrough. One of the lifeboat crewmen was drowned and his body was washed ashore a day later. At the inquiry it was noted that; 
1990 - whilst deploying the lifeboat to a call-out, a tractor driver collapsed and died.
 8 August 2018 - the crew were called out to a nine year-old child who had been trapped by a rockfall on the beach.

Fleet

References

Sources

External links

Lifeboat stations in Yorkshire
Buildings and structures in North Yorkshire
Loftus, North Yorkshire